Porphyry Bluff is a prominent rocky bluff extending from the coast to 2 miles inland, between Larsen Inlet and Longing Gap in Graham Land, Antarctica forming the northwest side of the entrance to Pizos Bay.  The bluff was mapped from surveys by Falkland Islands Dependencies Survey (FIDS) (1960–61). It is named by United Kingdom Antarctic Place-Names Committee (UK-APC) after the buff-colored quartz-plagioclase-porphyry rock which is characteristic of this exposure.

Cliffs of Graham Land
Nordenskjöld Coast